Kodanda Rama is a 2002 Indian Kannada language romantic comedy film directed, scripted and composed by V. Ravichandran. Besides Ravichandran, the film stars Shiva Rajkumar, Sakshi Shivanand, Asha Saini and Mohan Shankar. The film was a remake of Malayalam film Thenkasipattanam (2000) directed by Rafi Mecartin. The film's widely acclaimed success led to its remake in Tamil with the same title name in 2002, in Telugu as Hanuman Junction (2001) and in Bengali as Golmaal (2008). However, the Kannada version did not match the success of its Malayalam, Tamil and Telugu versions.

Cast 
 V. Ravichandran as Kodanda
 Shiva Rajkumar as Rama
 Sakshi Shivanand as Meenakshi
 Asha Saini as Sangeetha
 Mohan Shankar
 Sadhu Kokila
 Ramesh Bhat
 Kishori Ballal
Lakshman rao 
K.D.Venkatesh
Bank suresh 
Shailaja Joshi 
Pailwaan Venu 
 Bank Janardhan
 Mandeep Rai
 Mimicry Dayanand
 Ashalatha

Soundtrack 
The music was composed and lyrics written by V. Ravichandran. A total of 5 tracks have been composed for the film and the audio rights brought by Jhankar Music.

Reception 
The reviewer for Screen called the film a "rib-tickling comedy besides being an action feast" and that it "consists of a rare subject that is refreshing and fits the prominent stars." Before concluding that it was a "movie worth watching", the reviewer wrote, "While Ravichandran deserves full credit for making this a wholesome entertainer, it is Shivrajkumar who steals the show with wonderful emotional performance. The team of Mohan, Sadhu Kokila, Mandip Rai and Mandya Ramesh sends the audience in peels of laughter in the theatre."

References

External links 

 2002 Year Round Up

2002 films
2002 action comedy films
2000s Kannada-language films
Indian action comedy films
Films scored by V. Ravichandran
Kannada remakes of Malayalam films
2002 romantic comedy films
Indian romantic comedy films